Muhammad Syazwan bin Tajudin  (born 7 January 1994 in Kedah) is a Malaysian footballer who  mainly operates as defender for Kedah Darul Aman.

Owing to injury sustained in a match against Johor Darul Ta'zim, Syazwan unable to play the remainder of the 2016 Malaysia Super League from April 30.

Career statistics

Club

Honours

Club
Kedah
 Malaysian FA Cup: 2017, 2019
 Malaysia Premier League: 2015
 Malaysia Cup: 2016
 Malaysia Charity Shield: 2017

References

External links
 

Malaysian footballers
Kedah Darul Aman F.C. players
People from Kedah
Living people
1994 births
Malaysian people of Malay descent
Malaysian expatriate footballers
Singapore Premier League players
Expatriate footballers in Singapore
Association football defenders
Malaysia Super League players